Weldon Henley (October 25, 1880 – November 16, 1960), was a Major League Baseball pitcher from 1903 to 1907. He played for the Philadelphia Athletics and Brooklyn Dodgers.

Henley made his major league debut on April 23, 1903.  He pitched a no-hitter against the St. Louis Browns in the first game of a doubleheader on July 22, 1905.

Henley was the first Georgia Tech alumnus to play in the Majors. His fraternity was Sigma Nu.

References

External links

1880 births
1960 deaths
Major League Baseball pitchers
Baseball players from Georgia (U.S. state)
Philadelphia Athletics players
Brooklyn Superbas players
Georgia Tech Yellow Jackets baseball players
Memphis Egyptians players
Nashville Vols players
Atlanta Firemen players
Rochester Bronchos players
People from Jasper, Georgia
Sportspeople from the Atlanta metropolitan area